The 2000 season of the 3. divisjon, the fourth highest association football league for men in Norway.

Between 20 and 22 games (depending on group size) were played in 19 groups, with 3 points given for wins and 1 for draws. Unusually few teams were relegated, as the league was expanded to 24 groups in 2001; several extra groups in Eastern Norway and one extra in the Southwest. All group winners had the chance to be promoted to the 2. divisjon through playoff, but as the playoff contained teams from the 2. divisjon as well, those teams usually prevailed. Only four teams—Nybergsund, Nest-Sotra, Stjørdals-Blink and Hammerfest— won promotion.

Tables 

Group 1
Sparta – lost playoff
Aurskog/Finstadbru
Sørumsand
Råde
Kjelsås 2
Greåker
Skeid 2
Holmen
Høland
Tune – relegated
Bækkelaget
Navestad

Group 2
Rygge – lost playoff
Moss 2
Fredrikstad 2
Grorud
Trøgstad/Båstad
Vestli
Kjellmyra
Galterud
Grue
Frigg
Spydeberg
Flisa

Group 3
Østsiden – lost playoff
KFUM
Selbak
Skjetten 2
Fagerborg
Bjerke
Volla
Oslo Øst 2
Fjellhamar
Lisleby
Korsvoll
Torp

Group 4
Nybergsund – won playoff
Toten
Ham-Kam 2
Vang
Fart
Lom
Ringsaker
Trysil
Kvam
FF Lillehammer 2
Sel/Otta
Gjøvik-Lyn 2

Group 5
Runar – lost playoff
Vestfossen
Jevnaker
Raufoss 2
Teie
Grindvoll
Åmot
Falk
Borre
Sør-Aurdal
L/F Hønefoss 2
Bygdø

Group 6
Mjøndalen – lost playoff
Larvik Turn
Flint
Drafn
Birkebeineren
Siljan
Seljord
Notodden
Åssiden
Slemmestad
Tønsberg FK
Rjukan

Group 7
Jerv – lost playoff
Vindbjart
Øyestad
Lyngdal
Langesund/Stathelle
Flekkerøy
Våg
Giv Akt
Kvinesdal
Sandefjord BKSandefjord 2
Herkules
Langangen

Group 8
Ålgård – lost playoff
Klepp
Egersund
Bryne 2
Figgjo
Eiger
Sola
Rosseland
Hana
Staal
Ganddal
Tasta

Group 9
Nest-Sotra – won playoff
Vedavåg
Skjold
Haugesund 2
Nordhordland
Torvastad
Trott
Gneist
Trio
Nærbø
Bremnes
Trane

Group 10
Brann 2 – lost playoff
Radøy
Hald
Askøy
Lyngbø
Follese
Hovding
Austevoll
Bergen Nord
Vadmyra
Bjarg
Frøya

Group 11
Sogndal 2 – lost playoff
Stryn
Eid
Dale
Saga
Sandane
Høyang
Eikefjord
Vik – relegated
Jølster – relegated
Årdalstangen/Lærdal – relegated
Svelgen – relegated

Group 12
Langevåg – lost playoff
Velledalen og Ringen
Brattvåg
Åram/Vankam
Aalesund 2
Ha/No
Vigra
Bergsøy
Volda
Ellingsøy – relegated
Hødd 2 – relegated
Sunnylven – relegated

Group 13
Kristiansund – lost playoff
Gossen
Surnadal
Åndalsnes
Averøykameratene
Bryn
Midsund
Ekko/Aureosen
Vestnes Varfjell
Bøfjord – relegated
Grykameratene – relegated
Rival – relegated

Group 14
Nidelv – lost playoff
Løkken
Tynset
Nardo
Buvik
Melhus
NTNUI
Kvik
Røros
KIL/Hemne
Brekken – relegated
Frøya – relegated

Group 15
Stjørdals-Blink – won playoff
Bangsund
Rissa
Varden
Bogen
Namsos
Malvik/Hommelvik
Rørvik
Selbu
Freidig – relegated
Fram – relegated
Vuku – relegated

Group 16
Gevir Bodø – lost playoff, then defunct
Brønnøysund
Sandnessjøen
Sørfold – relegated
Tverlandet
Korgen/Hemnes – relegated
Strandkameratene – relegated
Nesna
Leirfjord
Mosjøen 2 – relegated
Saltdalkameratene – relegated

Group 17
Flakstad – lost playoff
Skånland
Lofoten 2 – relegated
Melbo
Beisfjord
Medkila
Morild
Kvæfjord – relegated
Harstad 2
Leknes – relegated
Landsås – relegated
Vågakameratene – relegated

Group 18
Fløya – lost playoff
Ramfjord
Tromsø 2
Tromsdalen 2
Ishavsbyen
Nordreisa
Pioner – relegated
Kvaløysletta
Ulfstind – relegated
Bardu – relegated
Målselv/Mellembygd – relegated
Lyngstuva – relegated

Group 19
Hammerfest – won playoff
Nordlys
Kautokeino
Honningsvåg
Polarstjernen
Porsanger
Kirkenes
Tverrelvdalen
Sørøy Glimt
Nerskogen
Norild – relegated
Vardø/Domen – relegated

Playoffs

References

Norwegian Third Division seasons
4
Norway
Norway